Inanam is a state constituency in Sabah, Malaysia, that has been represented in the Sabah State Legislative Assembly. It is mandated to return a single member to the Assembly under the first-past-the-post voting system.

History

Representation history

Polling districts 
As at 12 February 2016, this constituency contains the polling districts of Telipok Laut, Telipok Darat, Tobobon, Kokol, Menggatal, Pulutan, Inanam Darat, Poring-Poring, Kolam Ayer, Cenderakasih, Pekan Inanam and Bantayan.

Election Results

References 

Sabah state constituencies